LaKeySha Amr Frazier-Bosley (born January 5, 1993) is a Democratic member of the Missouri General Assembly representing the State's 79th House district.

Career
Frazier-Bosley won the election on November 6, 2018 from the platform of Democratic Party. She secured ninety percent of the vote while her closest rival Libertarian Dan Elder secured ten percent.

Electoral history

References

1993 births
21st-century American politicians
21st-century American women politicians
Living people
Frazier-Bosley, LaKeySha
Women state legislators in Missouri